A timeline of the history of ballet:
 14th century
Medieval dance
 15th century
 16th century
Renaissance dance
Ballet de cour
 Intermedio - Italian court spectaculars with dance
Ballet Comique de la Reine - sometimes called the "first ballet"
 17th century
French ballet
Comédie-ballet
 18th century
Baroque dance
Opéra-ballet
Ballet d'action
 19th century
Classical ballet 
Azerbaijani
British
French
Italian
Russian
Pre-romantic ballet
Romantic ballet
 20th century
Modern ballet
Neoclassical ballet
Postmodern dance
Concert dance
Contemporary ballet
Post-structuralist ballet

See also 
 Ballet
 List of ballets by title

Culture-related timelines
Timeline, Ballet
History of ballet